Elizabeth Watson (born 30 March 1994), commonly known as Liz Watson, is an Australia netball international. Watson was a member of the Australia teams that won the silver medals at the 2018 Commonwealth Games and at the 2019 Netball World Cup. In 2018 and 2022 she received the Liz Ellis Diamond award. She captained Australia during the 2021 Constellation Cup. Since 2014, Watson has played for Melbourne Vixens, initially in the ANZ Championship and later in Suncorp Super Netball. She was a member of the Vixens' teams that won premierships in 2014 and 2020.

Early life, family and education
Watson is originally from Melbourne. She was born in Carlton and raised in Pascoe Vale South. She is the daughter of Manuela and Neil Watson. Her mother's family are Italian. Her two uncles, Anthony and Steven Alessio, and her older brother, Matthew Watson, are all former Australian rules footballers. She attended Penleigh and Essendon Grammar School and La Trobe University, studying health science at the latter. As of 2022, Watson is currently studying for a Bachelor of Education (Primary) at Deakin University.

Playing career

Netball Victoria
Watson began playing netball seriously from the age of 12. Her mother was a netball player and Watson credits her for teaching her how to play. She subsequently went on to represent Victoria at under-12, under-15, under-17, under-19 and under-21 levels.   In 2012 she was a member of the Victoria under-19 team that won the Australian National Netball Championships.  In 2013 she was a member of the Victoria under-21 team that were runners-up.

City West Falcons
In 2013, Watson played for City West Falcons in the Victorian Netball League, where she was coached by Nicole Richardson. She helped Falcons win the 2013 VNL title and was named Player of the Grand Final.

Victorian Flames
In 2013, Watson also captained Victorian Flames in the Australian Netball League. She was the Flames MVP for the season, helping them finish third in the ANL.

Melbourne Vixens
Since 2014, Watson has played for Melbourne Vixens, initially in the ANZ Championship and later in Suncorp Super Netball.  She was called up for the Vixens team after Elissa Kent had to dropout due to pregnancy.  Watson was a member of the Vixens' teams that won the 2014 ANZ Championship and was subsequently named Vixens' Rookie of the Year.  In 2017, Watson was a member of the Vixens team that finished the inaugural Suncorp Super Netball regular season as minor premiers.  She was also named the 2017 Young Star. Between 2017 and 2020, Watson was named as the wing attack in the Suncorp Super Netball Team of the Year on four successive occasions.  In 2017 and 2018 she was also named the Vixens' MVP, winning the Sharelle McMahon Medal.  In 2020, Watson, alongside Kate Moloney, co-captained Vixens when they finished the season as both minor premiers and overall champions. Watson missed the 2021 season due to a long-standing foot injury that needed surgery.

Australia
Watson made her senior debut for Australia on 20 January 2016 during an away series against England. 
 Watson was a member of the Australia teams that won the silver medals at the 2018 Commonwealth Games and at the 2019 Netball World Cup.  In 2018 she was awarded the Liz Ellis Diamond award and was named Australian International Player of the Year.  Watson captained Australia during the 2021 Constellation Cup.  In September 2021 she was confirmed as Australia's captain.

Honours
Australia
Netball World Cup
Runners up: 2019
Commonwealth Games
Winners: 2022
Runners Up: 2018
Constellation Cup
Winners: 2016, 2017, 2018, 2019  
Runners Up: 2021
Netball Quad Series
Winners: 2016, 2018 (September), 2018 (January), 2019, 2022, 2023
Runners Up: 2017 (August/September)
Melbourne Vixens
Suncorp Super Netball
Winners: 2020
Minor Premierships: 2017, 2020
ANZ Championship
Winners: 2014
Minor Premierships: 2014
City West Falcons
Victorian Netball League
Winners: 2013
Victoria
Australian National Netball Championships
Winners: Under-19 (2012)
Runners-up: Under-21 (2013)
Individual Awards

References

Living people
1994 births
Australian netball players
Australia international netball players
Melbourne Vixens players
Netball players at the 2018 Commonwealth Games
Commonwealth Games medallists in netball
Commonwealth Games silver medallists for Australia
Netball players at the 2022 Commonwealth Games
Commonwealth Games gold medallists for Australia
2019 Netball World Cup players
ANZ Championship players
Suncorp Super Netball players
Victorian Netball League players
Australian Netball League players
People educated at Penleigh and Essendon Grammar School
La Trobe University alumni
Deakin University alumni
Australian people of Italian descent
Sportspeople of Italian descent
Netball players from Melbourne
People from Pascoe Vale, Victoria
Medallists at the 2018 Commonwealth Games
Medallists at the 2022 Commonwealth Games